A dungeon is a room or cell in which prisoners are held, especially underground. Dungeons are generally associated with medieval castles, though their association with torture probably belongs more to the Renaissance period. An oubliette (from french oublier meaning to forget) or bottle dungeon is a basement room which is accessible only from a hatch or hole (an angstloch) in a high ceiling. Victims in oubliettes were often left to starve and dehydrate to death, making the practice akin to—and some say an actual variety of—immurement.

Etymology
The word dungeon comes from French donjon (also spelled dongeon), which means "keep", the main tower of a castle. The first recorded instance of the word in English was near the beginning of the 14th century when it held the same meaning as donjon. The proper original meaning of "keep" is still in use for academics, although in popular culture it has been largely misused and come to mean a cell or "oubliette". Though it is uncertain, both dungeon and donjon are thought to derive from the Middle Latin word dominus, meaning "lord" or "master".

In French, the term donjon still refers to a "keep", and the English term "dungeon" refers mostly to oubliette in French. Donjon is therefore a false friend to dungeon (although the game Dungeons & Dragons is titled Donjons et Dragons in its French editions).

An oubliette (same origin as the French oublier, meaning "to forget") is a basement room which is accessible only from a hatch or hole (an angstloch) in a high ceiling.

The use of "donjons" evolved over time, sometimes to include prison cells, which could explain why the meaning of "dungeon" in English evolved over time from being a prison within the tallest, most secure tower of the castle into meaning a cell, and by extension, in popular use, an oubliette or even a torture chamber.

The earliest use of oubliette in French dates back to 1374, but its earliest adoption in English is Walter Scott's Ivanhoe in 1819: "The place was utterly dark—the oubliette, as I suppose, of their accursed convent."

History
Few Norman keeps in English castles originally contained prisons, though they were more common in Scotland. Imprisonment was not a usual punishment in the Middle Ages, so most prisoners were awaiting trial, sentence or a political solution. Noble prisoners were not generally held in dungeons, but lived in some comfort in castle apartments. The Tower of London is famous for housing political prisoners, and Pontefract Castle at various times held Thomas of Lancaster (1322), Richard II (1400), Earl Rivers (1483), Richard Scrope, Archbishop of York (1405), James I of Scotland (1405–1424) and Charles, Duke of Orléans (1417–1430). Purpose-built prison chambers in castles became more common after the 12th century, when they were built into gatehouses or mural towers. Some castles had larger provision for prisoners, such as the prison tower at Caernarfon Castle.

Features

Although many real dungeons are simply a single plain room with a heavy door or with access only from a hatchway or trapdoor in the floor of the room above, the use of dungeons for torture, along with their association to common human fears of being trapped underground, have made dungeons a powerful metaphor in a variety of contexts. Dungeons, as a whole, have become associated with underground complexes of cells and torture chambers. As a result, the number of true dungeons in castles is often exaggerated to interest tourists. Many chambers described as dungeons or oubliettes were in fact water-cisterns or even latrines.

An example of what might be popularly termed an "oubliette" is the particularly claustrophobic cell in the dungeon of Warwick Castle's Caesar's Tower, in central England.  The access hatch consists of an iron grille. Even turning around (or moving at all) would be nearly impossible in this tiny chamber.

However, the tiny chamber that is described as the oubliette, is in reality a short shaft which opens up into a larger chamber with a latrine shaft entering it from above. This suggests that the chamber is in fact a partially back-filled drain. The positioning of the supposed oubliette within the larger dungeon, situated in a small alcove, is typical of garderobe arrangement within medieval buildings. These factors perhaps point to this feature being the remnants of a latrine rather than a cell for holding prisoners. Footage of the inside of this chamber can be seen in episode 3 of the first series of Secrets of Great British Castles. 

A "bottle dungeon" is sometimes simply another term for an oubliette. It has a narrow entrance at the top and sometimes the room below is even so narrow that it would be impossible to lie down but in other designs the actual cell is larger.

The identification of dungeons and rooms used to hold prisoners is not always a straightforward task. Alnwick Castle and Cockermouth Castle, both near England's border with Scotland, had chambers in their gatehouses which have often been interpreted as oubliettes. However, this has been challenged. These underground rooms (accessed by a door in the ceiling) were built without latrines, and since the gatehouses at Alnwick and Cockermouth provided accommodation it is unlikely that the rooms would have been used to hold prisoners. An alternative explanation was proposed, suggesting that these were strong-rooms where valuables were stored.

In fiction
Oubliettes and dungeons were a favorite topic of nineteenth century gothic novels or historical novels, where they appeared as symbols of hidden cruelty and tyrannical power. Usually found under medieval castles or abbeys, they were used by villainous characters to persecute blameless characters. In Alexandre Dumas's La Reine Margot, Catherine de Medici is portrayed gloating over a victim in the oubliettes of the Louvre.

Dungeons are common elements in modern fantasy literature, related tabletop, and video games. The most famous examples are the various Dungeons & Dragons media. In this context, the word "dungeon" is often used broadly to describe any labyrinthine complex (castle, cave system, etc) rather than a prison cell or torture chamber specifically. A role-playing game involving dungeon exploration is called a dungeon crawl.

Near the beginning of Jack Vance's high-fantasy Lyonesse Trilogy (1983–1989), King Casmir of Lyonesse commits Prince Aillas of Troicinet, who he believes to be a vagabond, to an oubliette for the crime of having seduced his daughter. After some months, the resourceful prince fashions a ladder from the bones of earlier prisoners and the rope by which he had been lowered, and escapes.

In the musical fantasy film Labyrinth, director Jim Henson includes a scene in which the heroine Sarah is freed from an oubliette by the dwarf Hoggle, who defines it for her as "a place you put people... to forget about 'em!"

In the Thomas Harris novel The Silence of the Lambs, Clarice makes a descent into Gumb's basement dungeon labyrinth in the narrative's climactic scene, where the killer is described as having an oubliette.

In the Robert A. Heinlein novel Stranger in a Strange Land, the term "oubliette" is used to refer to a trash disposal much like the "memory holes" in Nineteen Eighty-Four.

In Brian Jacques's Redwall series, several buildings are known to have dungeons: Castle Floret of The Bellmaker turned out to have a dungeon, which held the castle's rightful owner Gael Squirrelking, his wife Serena, their son Truffen, and the badger Muta, after the castle was taken from them by the villainess foxes Urgan Nagru and Silvamord. It also added the heroes Mariel Gullwhacker, Dandin and Meldrum Fallowthorn the hare, and at one point the shrike Glokkpod. Fort Bladegirt of the prequel Mariel of Redwall, ruled by the pirate rat Gabool the Wild, also sported dungeons where he kept prisoners (which include Mariel), with one housing his pet scorpion Skrabblag. In Mossflower, the fortress Kotir had a dungeon used by the wildcat Tsarmina Greeneyes, where she imprisoned Martin the warrior, Gonff the mousethief, her own brother Gingivere Greeneyes, and the hedgehog brothers Ferdy and Coggs Stickle. Even the titular location Redwall Abbey had a dungeon in the Redwall TV series, where it held the rats Redtooth and Fangburn.

See also
 Immurement
 Keep

References

Further reading

 

Castle architecture
Rooms
Imprisonment and detention